Kosmos 2485 ( meaning Space 2485) is a  Russian military satellite launched in 2013 as part of the GLONASS satellite navigation system.

This satellite is a GLONASS-M satellite, also known as Uragan-M, and is numbered Uragan-M No. 747.

Kosmos 2485 was launched from Site 43/4  at Plesetsk Cosmodrome in northern Russia. A Soyuz-2-1b carrier rocket with a Fregat upper stage was used to perform the launch which took place at 05:23 UTC on 26 April 2013. The launch successfully placed the satellite into Medium Earth orbit. It subsequently received its Kosmos designation, and the international designator 2013-019A. The United States Space Command assigned it the Satellite Catalog Number 39155.

The satellite is in orbital plane 1, in orbital slot 2.

See also

List of Kosmos satellites (2251–2500)
List of R-7 launches (2010–2014)

References

Spacecraft launched in 2013
Spacecraft launched by Soyuz-2 rockets
Kosmos satellites